Elections to Essex County Council took place on 4 May 2017 as part of the 2017 local elections. All 75 councillors were elected from 70 electoral divisions, which each returned either one or two councillors by first-past-the-post voting for a four-year term of office.

The electoral divisions were the same as those used at the previous elections in 2009 and 2013. No elections were held in Thurrock or Southend-on-Sea, which are unitary authorities outside the area covered by the County Council.

Previous composition

2013 election

Composition of council seats before election

Changes between elections

In between the 2013 election and the 2017 election, the following council seats changed hands:

Summary
The election saw the Conservative Party retained overall control of the council, with a increased majority.

Results Summary

|-bgcolor=#F6F6F6
| colspan=2 style="text-align: right; margin-right: 1em" | Total
| style="text-align: right;" | 75
| colspan=5 |
| style="text-align: right;" | 372,834
| style="text-align: right;" | 
|-

Election of Group Leaders

David Finch (Hedingham) was re elected leader of the Conservative Group, with Kevin Bentley (Stanway and Pyefleet) as his deputy.

Michael Mackrory (Springfield) was re elected leader of the Liberal Democratic Group, with Anne Turrell (Mile End and Highwoods) as his deputy.

Ivan Henderson (Harwich) was re elected leader of the Labour Group, with Julie Young (Wivenhoe St Andrew) as his deputy.

Chris Pond (Loughton Central) was elected leader of the Non-Aligned Group with James Abbott (Witham Northern) as his deputy.

Election of Leader of the Council

David Finch the leader of the conservative group was duly elected leader of the council and formed a conservative administration.

Results by District

Basildon

District Summary

Division Results

Between 2013 and 2017, UKIP gained the Labour seat in a by-election, however it is shown as a hold as the comparison is made to the last full council election.

Braintree

District Summary

Division Results

Brentwood

District Summary

Division Results

Castle Point

District Summary

Division Results

Chelmsford

District Summary

Division Results

Colchester

District Summary

Division Results

Epping Forest

District Summary

Division Results

Harlow

District Summary

Division Results

Maldon

District Summary

Division Results

Rochford 

District Summary

Division Results

Tendring

District Summary

Division Results

Between 2013 and 2017, the seat was won by the Independent candidate in a by-election, however it is shown as a gain as it is compared to the previous full council election.

The Conservative candidate was elected previously as a UKIP candidate and subsequently switched their party affiliation. The seat is therefore shown as a gain.

Uttlesford

District Summary

Division Results

By-elections

Summary

Results

Clacton East

Stephenson's vote share change is compared to the 2017 result when he stood as a UKIP candidate.

References

2017
2017 English local elections
2010s in Essex